Lucinda Roy (born December 19, 1955) is an American-based British novelist, educator and poet.

Biography
She was born in Battersea, South London, England, to Jamaican writer and artist Namba Roy and Yvonne Roy (née Shelley), an English actor and teacher. Lucinda Roy grew up in England and received her Bachelor of Arts in English from King's College London before moving to the United States, where she earned a Master of Fine Arts in creative writing at the University of Arkansas.

In 1988, she published her first collection of poetry, Wailing the Dead to Sleep. American poet Nikki Giovanni wrote the introduction. In 1995, Roy's second poetry collection, The Hummingbirds, was selected by poet Lucille Clifton as the winner of the Eighth Mountain Poetry Prize.

Roy has also published two novels, the semi-autobiographical Lady Moses (HarperCollins, 1998) and Hotel Alleluia (HarperCollins, 2000).

Her poetry, fiction, and commentaries have appeared in numerous publications, including North American Review, American Poetry Review, Rattle, Prairie Schooner, The New York Times, Chronicle of Higher Education, The Guardian, Inside Higher Education, and USA Today, as well as featuring in such anthologies as Mixed: An Anthology of Short Fiction on the Multiracial Experience (ed. Chandra Prasad, 2006), Go Girl: Black Woman's Book of Travel and Adventure (ed. Elaine Lee, 1997) and Daughters of Africa: An International Anthology of Words and Writings by Women of African Descent (ed. Margaret Busby, 1992).

Roy is currently the Director of Creative Writing at Virginia Tech in Blacksburg, Virginia, and was named Alumni Distinguished Professor of English. She is also the Vice President of the Association of Writers & Writing Programs.

Virginia Tech shooting

In April 2007, after the Virginia Tech shootings, it was revealed that two years earlier, Roy had noted violent tendencies in shooter Seung-Hui Cho's behavior and writings. She warned campus authorities about him at that time, but as Cho had not made any specific threats, the authorities could not take any action or force Cho to get psychiatric help.

Roy subsequently wrote a book about the tragedy, No Right to Remain Silent: The Tragedy at Virginia Tech. She appeared on CBS News with Katie Couric on April 12, 2009, to mark the second anniversary of the shootings. Roy stated that Cho had twice sought attention from a mental health specialist on campus that she had recommended to him, but that Cho "was never really examined."

Works
Wailing the Dead to Sleep (1988)
The Hummingbirds (1995)
Lady Moses (1998)
The Hotel Alleluia (2000)
No Right to Remain Silent: The Tragedy at Virginia Tech (2009)
Fabric: Poems (2017)
The Dreambird Chronicles
The Freedom Race (2021)
Flying the Coop (2022)

References

Citations

Sources

 (free article preview)

External links
 Official website
 Lucinda Roy, "Even after Newtown, Americans will resist Obama's call to tighten gun laws", The Guardian, December 16, 2012.

1955 births
Living people
Alumni of King's College London
English women poets
English women novelists
People from Battersea
Virginia Tech faculty
Virginia Tech shooting
Writing teachers
Writers from London
20th-century English poets
20th-century English novelists
20th-century English women writers
21st-century English poets
21st-century English women writers
University of Arkansas alumni
English people of Jamaican descent
British emigrants to the United States